The 1974–75 Copa del Generalísimo was the 73rd staging of the Spanish Cup. The competition began on 30 October 1974 and ended on 5 July 1975.

First round

Second round

Third round

|}

Fourth round

|}
Bye: RCD Mallorca and Real Betis.

Fifth round

|}

Round of 16

|}

Quarter-finals

|}

Semi-finals

|}

Final

|}

External links
 rsssf.com
 linguasport.com

Copa del Rey seasons
Copa del Rey
Copa